The 2020–21 season is FC Sheriff Tiraspol's 24th season, and their 23rd in the Divizia Naţională, the top-flight of Moldovan football. Sheriff are defending Divizia Naţională and Moldovan Cup champions and they will also take part in the Champions League First Qualifying Round.

Season events
On 10 March, the Moldovan Football Federation delayed the start of the 2020 season due to the COVID-19 pandemic until 4 April 2020.
On 30 March, all football in Moldova was suspended for the foreseeable future.

On 18 June, the Moldovan Football Federation announced that the 2019–20 Moldovan Cup would restart on 21 June, whilst the Divizia Națională would commence on 3 July. The following day, Sheriff Tiraspol's Moldovan Cup games where confirmed for 21 & 25 June.

On 14 August, the Divizia Națională was postponed.

On 17 August, Sheriff Tiraspol signed Shahrom Samiyev from Rubin Kazan, before immediately loaning him out to Dinamo-Auto Tiraspol until the end of the year. On the same day, Sheriff Tiraspol also announced the signing of Keston Julien from AS Trenčín.

On 4 September, Sheriff Tiraspol announced the signing of Dabney dos Santos.

On 21 October, Zoran Zekić's contract was terminated by mutual consent, with Victor Mihailov being placed in temporary charge.

On 28 November, the Divizia Națională was suspended due to the COVID-19 pandemic in Moldova.

On 18 December, Yuriy Vernydub was announced as Sheriff Tiraspol's new manager.

On 29 December, Captain Veaceslav Posmac signed a new extended contract with Sheriff Tiraspol.

On 18 January, Sheriff Tiraspol announced the signing of Sébastien Thill on loan from Progrès Niederkorn.

On 28 January, Vadim Paireli left the club to sign for Armenian club FC Noah, whilst Lovro Bizjak joined Sheriff Tiraspol on 29 January after previously playing for Ufa.

On 1 February, Sheriff Tiraspol announced the signing of Danilo Arboleda from Deportivo Pasto.

On 3 February, Sheriff Tiraspol announced the signing of Nadrey Dago from Osijek.

On 4 February, Sheriff Tiraspol announced the signing of Dušan Marković from Rad.

On 6 February, Sheriff Tiraspol announced the signing of Gustavo Dulanto from Boavista.

On 8 February, Sheriff Tiraspol announced the signing of Fernando from Botafogo. The following day, Sheriff Tiraspol announced the signing of Peter Banda on loan from Big Bullets, with Adama Traoré joining the following day from Metz on 10 February. On 11 February, Sheriff Tiraspol announced the signing of Stjepan Radeljić from Osijek.

On 15 March, Sheriff Tiraspol announced the signing of Moussa Kyabou from USC Kita.

On 20 March, the Divizia Națională was postponed for a third time.

Squad

Out on loan

Transfers

In

 Transfers announced on the above date, but not finalised until 20 January 2020.

Loans in

Out

Loans out

Released

Friendlies

Competitions

Divizia Națională

Results summary

Results

League table

Moldovan Cup

2019–20

2020–21

Final

UEFA Champions League

Qualifying rounds

UEFA Europa League

Qualifying rounds

Squad Statistics

Appearances and goals

|-
|colspan="16"|Players away on loan :
|-
|colspan="16"|Players who left Sheriff Tiraspol during the season:

|}

Goal scorers

Clean sheets

Disciplinary Record

Notes

References

External links 
 

FC Sheriff Tiraspol seasons
Sheriff Tiraspol
Moldovan football clubs 2020–21 season